Pellizzari is a village in north-west Italy.

Pelizzari may also refer to:
 Bruno Pellizzari (1907–1991), Italian cyclist
 Juan Masferrer Pellizzari (1940–2017), Chilean politician
 Paolo Pellizzari (born 1956), Italian photographer
 Pellizzari reaction, a chemical reaction between an amide and a hydrazide
 Umberto Pelizzari (born 1965), Italian freediver
 Stefano Pellizzari (born 1997), Italian footballer